Pěnčín is a municipality and village in Liberec District in the Liberec Region of the Czech Republic. It has about 700 inhabitants.

Administrative parts
Villages of Albrechtice, Červenice, Kamen, Střížovice, Vitanovice and Zásada are administrative parts of Pěnčín.

References

External links

 

Villages in Liberec District